The Dubai Duty Free Tennis Stadium is a tennis complex in Dubai, United Arab Emirates. The complex is the host of the annual 500 series stop, the Dubai Tennis Championships.  The Dubai Tennis Stadium has a capacity of 5,000 people.

See also
 List of tennis stadiums by capacity

References

External links 
 central court
 Wikimapia Site

Sports venues in Dubai
Tennis venues in the United Arab Emirates
International Premier Tennis League
Sports venues completed in 1996
1996 establishments in the United Arab Emirates